Never Ever is a 1998 independent film written and directed by Charles Finch, and starring Finch, Sandrine Bonnaire, and Jane March.

Plot
Thomas and Amanda Murray, a British couple who move to Paris, where Thomas gets a job working at a bank owned by Amanda's father, Arthur. Amanda does not like Paris, and returns home to London. Thomas then meets up with a French woman named Katherine, and begins an affair with her.

External links

1996 films
1996 drama films
American independent films
Adultery in films
British drama films
British independent films
1998 drama films
1998 films
1990s English-language films
1990s American films
1990s British films